Pablita is a given name. Notable people with the name include:

 Pablita Abeyta (1953–2017), American Navajo sculptor and activist 
 Pablita Velarde (1918–2006), American Pueblo artist and painter

Feminine given names